Ware railway station is on the Hertford East branch line off the West Anglia Main Line in the east of England, serving the town of Ware, Hertfordshire. Its three-letter station code is WAR. 

The station and all trains calling are operated by Greater Anglia.

It has a single bi-directional platform and track on what is otherwise a double-track railway. The station building dates back to the opening of the line in 1843.

Services
The typical Monday-Saturday off-peak service is two trains per hour to London Liverpool Street via Tottenham Hale, and two trains per hour to Hertford East.

The typical peak service towards London is three trains per hour, two of which are for Liverpool Street via Seven Sisters and one is for Stratford via Tottenham Hale.

The typical service on a Sunday is two trains per hour to Stratford via Tottenham Hale.

Services have previously been formed of Class 317 trains but from August 2021 new Class 720 are being introduced.

Oyster cards are accepted at the station.

References

External links 

Railway stations in Hertfordshire
DfT Category D stations
Former Great Eastern Railway stations
Railway stations in Great Britain opened in 1843
Greater Anglia franchise railway stations
1843 establishments in England
Ware, Hertfordshire